KOCZ-LP is a non-commercial low-power FM community radio station in Opelousas, Louisiana, United States. The station operates at a frequency of 94.9 MHz and features a mix of cajun, rhythm and blues, hip-hop, gospel and local public affairs, with a focus on the area's African-American community. The station, which was started as the third community radio "barnraising" initiative of the Prometheus Radio Project, went on the air on June 20, 2003.

KOCZ is licensed to the Southern Development Foundation, a civil rights group that provides funding and technical support to selected cooperatives and community organizations. The foundation operates a full-power (25,000 watts) FM station in nearby Lafayette, Louisiana, KIEE 88.3 FM.

KOCZ has garnered national attention for the role it plays in the Opelousas community. It was the subject of a New York Times article in 2011 and was cited by FCC Commissioner Jessica Rosenworcel in 2013 as an example of the unique local service low-power FM stations provide in top 50 radio markets.

See also
List of community radio stations in the United States

References

External links
 
 Southern Development Foundation

Low-power FM radio stations in Louisiana
Community radio stations in the United States
Radio stations established in 2003
2003 establishments in Louisiana
Radio stations in Louisiana